Eric Charles Henderson (born January 8, 1983) is an American football coach who is the defensive line coach and run game coordinator for the Los Angeles Rams of the National Football League (NFL). He previously served as an assistant coach for the Los Angeles Chargers.

Henderson played college football at Georgia Tech as a defensive end and was signed by the Cincinnati Bengals as an undrafted free agent in 2006 and played professionally for six seasons.

Playing career

College
While playing for the Georgia Tech Yellow Jackets, Henderson set a team career record with 59.5 tackles-for-loss (TFL), and he ranks fourth in school history in sacks (25). He had a breakout sophomore season in 2003, starting all 13 games and earning first-team All-Atlantic Coast Conference honors with 11 sacks and 24 TFL. He earned second-team All-ACC nods as both a junior and a senior. As a senior, he led the team with six sacks, despite missing four games with an ankle injury, and caused four fumbles on those sacks. He helped the Tech defense rank in the Top 25 nationally in seven categories in 2005, and he was a key performer as Tech upset No. 3 Miami, holding the Hurricanes to 30 yards rushing. In his first game back from his ankle injury in 2005, he played a key role in a 10–9 win over Clemson and was named ACC Defensive Lineman of the Week for the third time in his career. He played four seasons at Georgia Tech (2002–05), with a redshirt year in 2001. On January 21, 2006, he played in East–West Shrine Game in San Antonio, Texas.

National Football League

Pre-draft
He has a  bench press and a  vertical leap to his credit.

Cincinnati Bengals
Henderson missed seven games with injuries over his final two seasons at Georgia Tech, hurting his chances of being drafted, but he signed with the Bengals on May 9, 2006 as college free agent. He was waived on September 2, 2006 and then signed September 4 to the Bengals practice squad where he spent the full season.

Henderson played in all four preseason games in 2006, recording five total tackles, one sack, and one forced fumble. Henderson did not earn an accrued year of experience toward NFL free agency in 2006 because he was not on an NFL 53-player roster, a Reserve/Injured list, or a Reserve/Physically Unable to Perform list for the required minimum of six games. On January 2, 2007, he was signed to Bengals offseason roster.

Henderson spent the first seven weeks of the 2008 season on the Bengals' practice squad. He was signed to the active roster on October 24 after fullback Reagan Maui'a was placed on injured reserve. On December 10, Henderson was placed on season-ending injured reserve with a neck injury. He finished the 2008 season with two tackles in two games.

The Bengals released Henderson on April 27, 2009.

United Football League

Las Vegas Locomotives
Following his NFL career, Henderson spent three seasons (2009–11) with the Las Vegas Locomotives of the United Football League, helping the team win a pair of league championships.

Coaching career

Georgia Military College
In 2012, Henderson segued into coaching as a defensive assistant at Georgia Military College, where he worked with the outside linebackers and secondary. Henderson helped coach the Bulldogs to a 7–4 record and an appearance in the C.H.A.M.P.S. Heart of Texas Bowl.

Oklahoma State
In 2013, Henderson moved on to Oklahoma State, where he spent two seasons (2013–14) as a graduate assistant and a third (2015) as a defensive quality control coach. During his three years in Stillwater, the Cowboys went 27-12 and made three bowl appearances. Henderson helped tutor defensive end Emmanuel Ogbah, who earned All-America accolades; was named Big 12 Conference Defensive Player of the Year in 2015, and was drafted in the second round of the 2016 NFL Draft (32nd overall) by the Cleveland Browns.

UTSA
Henderson spent the 2016 season as the defensive line coach at Texas-San Antonio. The Roadrunners went 6-6 during the regular season before facing New Mexico in the Gildan New Mexico Bowl.

Los Angeles Chargers
In 2017, Henderson was hired the Los Angeles Chargers to serve as their assistant defensive line coach under head coach Anthony Lynn. During his two seasons with the Chargers, he worked with Pro Bowl defensive ends Joey Bosa and Melvin Ingram.

Los Angeles Rams
In 2019, Henderson was hired by the Los Angeles Rams to serve as their defensive line coach under head coach Sean McVay. In February 2021, Henderson was named run game coordinator while retaining his defensive line coaching duties. Henderson became a Super Bowl champion when the Rams defeated the Cincinnati Bengals in Super Bowl LVI.

Personal life
While at Georgia Tech, Henderson earned a bachelor's degree in management and is working toward a master's degree in educational psychology.

References

External links
 Los Angeles Rams bio
 Georgia Tech Yellow Jackets bio
 Just Sports Stats

1983 births
Living people
Sportspeople from New Orleans
Players of American football from New Orleans
American football defensive ends
American football linebackers
Georgia Tech Yellow Jackets football players
Cincinnati Bengals players
Las Vegas Locomotives players
Oklahoma State Cowboys football coaches
UTSA Roadrunners football coaches
Los Angeles Chargers coaches
Los Angeles Rams coaches